Fairfield Township, Nebraska may refer to the following places:

 Fairfield Township, Clay County, Nebraska
 Fairfield Township, Harlan County, Nebraska

See also 
 Fairfield Township (disambiguation)

Nebraska township disambiguation pages